The first season of Dance Your Ass Off aired from June 29, 2009 to September 7, 2009. It aired on the Oxygen network. It was the only season to feature Marissa Jaret Winokur as host. The show featured twelve overweight contestants competing to dance and lose weight. The medical doctor was Rob Huizenga from the USA Biggest Loser. For this season, the judges were Danny Teeson, Lisa Ann Walter and Mayte Garcia.

On the finale, Ruben defeated Pinky and Shayla to become the first ever Dance Your Ass Off champion.

Contestants
Angela - Eliminated Week 1
Warren - Eliminated Week 2
Karla - Eliminated Week 3
Tara - Eliminated Week 4
Brandon - Eliminated Week 4
Miles - Eliminated Week 5
Trice - Eliminated Week 6
Mara - Eliminated Week 7
Alicia - Eliminated Week 9
Shayla - 2nd Runner-Up - Fan Favorite
Pinky - Runner-Up
Ruben - Winner

Weigh ins - Pounds lost per week
 Most Weight Lost
 Least Weight Lost

Contestants & Weight per week
Contestants are listed in chronological order of elimination.

BMI
 Normal (18.5 - 24.9 BMI)
 Overweight (25 - 29.9 BMI)
 Obese Class I (30 - 34.9 BMI)
 Obese Class II (35 - 39.9 BMI)
 Obese Class III (greater than 40 BMI)
Rankings
 Eliminated Contestants Weigh-In (Finale)
 Winner ($100,000)
 Eliminated Winner ($5,000)
 Last person eliminated before finale

Contestants' average dance scores
 Best Score of the week.
 Worst Score of the week

Notes:

The first perfect 10 came in Week 6. The recipient was Shayla. That same week Ruben also received a 10.
The first perfect score (Three 10's) was the tango that Ruben had danced in Week 7.
No one was eliminated on Week 8.

Contestants' overall scores
 Contestant was in the bottom two of weight loss
 Contestant was eliminated
 Contestant was in the bottom two of weight loss and eliminated
 Contestant was in the bottom two for weight loss and was the winner that week
 Contestant was the winner for that week
 Contestant danced their ass off and was declared the winner of the show

Reunion
First aired September 7, 2009
Shayla won Fan Favorite and a check for $5000. Ruben lost more weight, totaling to 90 lbs. Miles and Alicia also lost 90 lbs by the reunion.

 Contestant gained some weight back by the reunion.

BMI
 Normal (18.5 - 24.9 BMI)
 Overweight (25 - 29.9 BMI)
 Obese Class I (30 - 34.9 BMI)
 Obese Class II (35 - 39.9 BMI)
 Obese Class III (greater than 40 BMI)

Updates
Warren - he topped the scales at 400 lbs then turned his life around and lost 150 lbs. He has kept the weight off.
Mara – has lost 60 lbs and wants to lose 20 lbs more - had lost 44 lbs at the reunion
Trice – has lost 74 lbs - had lost 69 lbs at the reunion
Alicia – has lost 110 lbs - had lost 90 lbs at the reunion 
Ruben – got Head of Wardrobe position for Cirque du Soleil’s newest show, “Viva Elvis” at City Center in Las Vegas
Tara – has lost 60 lbs, and doing cross-fit to lose 15 more.  She is a host for the LIPS Tour-Ladies International Poker Series and Orlando's American Heart Assoc Health Ambassador.

External links

Dance Your Ass Off Video & Gallery

2009 American television seasons